Beletski or Beletsky (feminine, in Russian: Beletskaya) is a Russian-language surname. Its Polish counterpart is Bielecki, Ukrainian: Biletskyi, Biletskyy.

The surname may refer to:
Alexei Beletski (born 1979), Israeli ice dancer
Irina Beletskaya (born 1933), Russian chemist
Stepan Petrovich Beletsky, statesman and head of the Police Department in the Russian Empire
Viktor Beletsky, Soviet diplomat
Monica Beletsky, American television producer and screenwriter

Russian-language surnames